The Greater Woman is a lost 1917 silent film drama starring Broadway actress Marjorie Rambeau in her first motion picture beginning a 40-year screen career. Mutual Film released the film and Frank Powell directed.

Cast
Marjorie Rambeau - Auriole Praed
Aubrey Beattie - Leo Bannister
Hassan Mussalli - Otto Bettany
Sara Haidez - Ida Angley
Frank A. Ford - Eustace Praed
Josephine Park - Fanny Praed
Margaret Grey - ?
H. H. Pattee - ?
Louis Stern - ?

References

External links

1917 films
Silent American drama films
American silent feature films
Lost American films
American films based on plays
1917 drama films
American black-and-white films
Mutual Film films
1917 lost films
Lost drama films
Films directed by Frank Powell
1910s American films